Brett Jones may refer to:

 Brett Jones (born 1989), petitioner in United States Supreme Court case Jones v. Mississippi (2021)
 Brett Jones (footballer) (born 1982), Australian rules footballer
 Brett Jones (gridiron football) (born 1991), American football center
 Brett Jones (songwriter), American singer and songwriter